The 1977–78 Alabama Crimson Tide men's basketball team represented the University of Alabama in the 1977–78 NCAA Division I men's basketball season. The team's head coach was C.M. Newton, who was in his tenth season at Alabama. The team played their home games at Coleman Coliseum in Tuscaloosa, Alabama. They finished the season 17–10, 11–7 in SEC play.

Roster

References 

Alabama Crimson Tide men's basketball seasons
Alabama
Crimson Tide men's basketball team
Crimson Tide men's basketball team